Joe Angyal (December 6, 1916 – June 26, 1954) was an American rower. He competed in the men's double sculls event at the 1948 Summer Olympics. A Marine Corps fighter pilot in World War II and reservist, Angyal was killed in 1954 when he crashed a jet fighter on Long Island.

References

External links
 

1916 births
1954 deaths
American male rowers
Olympic rowers of the United States
Rowers at the 1948 Summer Olympics
Sportspeople from New York City
United States Marine Corps pilots of World War II
United States Marine Corps officers
United States Navy reservists
United States Naval Aviators
Victims of aviation accidents or incidents in 1954
Aviators killed in aviation accidents or incidents in the United States
Accidental deaths in New York (state)